Daniel Slaughter ("Rusty" or "Big Dan") Tipple (February 13, 1890 – March 26, 1960), was a Major League Baseball pitcher who played in  with the New York Yankees. He batted and threw right-handed. Tipple had a 1-1 record, with a 0.95 ERA, in three games in his one-year career. He also played for various other teams in his minor league career (1912–1923, 1928).

References

External links

1890 births
1960 deaths
Major League Baseball pitchers
Baseball players from Illinois
Sportspeople from Rockford, Illinois
New York Yankees players
Streator Speedboys players
Bloomington Bloomers players
Huntington Blue Sox players
Omaha Rourkes players
Indianapolis Indians players
Baltimore Orioles (IL) players
Jersey City Skeeters players
Syracuse Stars (minor league baseball) players
Dallas Submarines players
Newark Bears (IL) players
Omaha Buffaloes players
Dallas Steers players
Minneapolis Millers (baseball) players
Omaha Crickets players
Streator Boosters players